Neupert is a surname. Notable people with the surname include:

Edmund Neupert (1842–1888), Norwegian pianist and composer
Robin Neupert (born 1991), German football player
Uwe Neupert (born 1957), German wrestler

See also
 Neupert effect, an empirical observation on X-ray emissions in solar flares, named after American scientist Werner Neupert